Héctor Hermilo Bonilla Rebentun (14 March 1939 – 25 November 2022) was a Mexican actor and director known for his movies Meridiano 100 and Rojo Amanecer.

Bonilla died on 25 November 2022, at the age of 83.

Filmography

Film

Television

References

External links 
 

1939 births
2022 deaths
Mexican male film actors
Mexican male telenovela actors
Mexican people of German descent
Best Actor Ariel Award winners
20th-century Mexican male actors
21st-century Mexican male actors
Male actors from Mexico City